Russian energy company Gazprom has several hundred subsidiaries and affiliated companies owned and controlled directly or indirectly. The subsidiaries and affiliated companies are listed by country. The list is incomplete.

Russia

100% ownership

 Gazprom Dobycha Astrakhan
 Gazprom Transgaz Ufa
 Burgaz
 Gazpromexport
 Gazflot
 Gazkomplektimpex
 Gaznadzor
 Gazobezopasnost
 Gazprom Dobycha Shelf Yuzhnosakhalinsk - Shtokman has been fired
 Gazpromavia
 Gazpromenergo
 Gazprominvestarena
 Gazprominvest
 Gazpromokhrana
 Gazpromrazvitiye
 Gazpromstroyengineering
 Gazsvyaz
 Gazprom Inform
 Gazprom Dobycha Irkutsk
 Gazprom Transgaz Makhachkala
 Gazprom Transgaz Stavropol
 Gazprom Transgaz Krasnodar
 Gazprom Dobycha Krasnodar
 Lentransgaz
 Mostransgaz
 Mezhregiongaz
 Nadymgazprom
 Nadymstroygazdobycha
 NIIgazekonomika
 Novy Urengoy Gas Chemicals Company
 Gazprom Dobycha Noyabrsk
 Science & Production Center Podzemgidromineral
 Orenburggazprom
 Permtransgaz
 Podzemgazprom
 Rosneftechim
 Samaratransgaz
 Severgazprom
 Severneftegazprom - holder of the licenses to develop the Yuzhno-Russkoye field
 Sevmorneftegaz - holder of the licenses to develop the Shtokman and Prirazlomnoye fields
 Surgutgazprom
 Szhizhenny gaz
 Tattransgaz
 Temryukmortrans
 Tomsktransgaz
 TyumenNIIgiprogaz
 Tyumentransgaz
 Uraltransgaz
 Urengoygazprom
 Volgogradtransgaz
 Volgotransgaz
 VNIIGAZ
 Yamalgazinvest
 Yamburggazdobycha
 Yugtransgaz

Ownership over 50%

 Dialoggazservice
 Ditangaz
 Electrogaz
 FC Zenit Saint Petersburg (76%) - football club who plays in Russian Premier League
 Fora Gazprom
 Future Fatherland Fund
 Gazenergoservice
 Gazprom Space Systems
 Gazmash
 Gazprombank
 Gazpromgeofizika
 Gazprom Neft
 GazpromPurInvest
 Gazpromtrubinvest
 Gazprom YRGM Trading (100% - 1 share owned by BASF) - gas trader for purchasing gas from Sevmorneftegaz
 Gaztelekom
 Giprogaztsentr
 Giprospetsgaz
 Krasnoyarskgazprom
 Orgenergogaz
 Gazprom Promgaz
 SeverEnergia
 SevKavNIPIgaz
 Sibur
 Tsentrenergogaz
 Tsentrgaz
 VNIPIgazdobycha
 Volgogaz
 Volgogradneftemash
 Vostokgazprom
 Zapsibgazprom
 Zarubezhneftegaz

Ownership 50% or less

 Achimgaz (50%) - joint venture with BASF
 Caspian Oil Company
 GazAgroFriport
 Gaztransit
 Gaz-Truby
 Horizon Investment Company
 Mosenergo (49.9%)
 Novatek (19.9%)
 Prometey-Sochi
 RNKB Usmanovoil
 Rosneftegazstroy
 Rosshelf
 SOGAZ (100% before 2004)
 Stroytransgaz
 TsentrKaspneftegaz (50%) - joint venture with Lukoil to develop Tsentralnaya field in the Caspian Sea (jointly with KazMunayGas)
 Tyumen Hotel
 Vega Investment Company
 VIP-Premier
 Vologdapromresurs
 YuzhNIIGiprogaz
 Zavod TBD

Armenia
 Gazprom Armenia (100%)

Austria

 ARosgas Holding AG (100%) - gas marketing
 Centrex Europe Energy & Gas AG (100%) - owned through Gazprombank
 GHW (50%) - joint venture with OMV for gas trading
 Sibneft Oil Trade GmbH (100%) - oil trading company owned through Gazprom Neft
 Vienna Capital Partners (???%) - financial advisor and investor 
 ZGG-Zarubezhgazneftechim Trading GmbH (100%) - 0gas trading company
 ZMB Gasspeicher Holding GmbH (66.67%) - 33.3% owned by Centrex Europe Energy & Gas AG

Belarus
 Belgazprombank (50%)
 Gazprom Transgaz Belarus (100%)

Bulgaria
 Topenergo (100%) - gas trading and transport

Cayman Islands
 ZGG Cayman Holding Ltd. (100%) - investment company
 ZGG Cayman Ltd (100%) - investment company

Cyprus

 Ecofran Marketing Consulting & Communication Services Company Limited
 GASEXCO Gas Exploration Company Ltd.
 Greatham Overseas Limited
 Private Company Limited by Shares GPBI (Cyprus) Ltd.
 Leadville Investments Ltd (100%) - investment company
 MF Media Finance (Overseas) Limited
 Odex Exploration Ltd. (20%) - oil exploration
 NTV World Ltd. - media company
 Siritia Ventures Ltd. - investment company

Czech Republic
 Gas-Invest S.A. (37.5%)
 Vemex s.r.o. (Securing Energy for Europe owns 51%)

Estonia
 Eesti Gaas AS (37.02%)

France
 Frangaz (50%) - joint venture with Gaz de France

Germany
 Agrogaz GmbH (100%)
 Centrex Beteiligungs GmbH (38%) - gas trading and investment company
 Ditgaz (49%)
 VNG - Verbundnetz Gas AG (5.3%) - gas transportation and marketing
 Wingas GmbH (100%) - joint venture with Wintershall, the subsidiary of BASF, for gas trading
 astora GmbH (50%) - joint venture with Wintershall, the subsidiary of BASF, for gas storage
 GASCADE GmbH (50%) - joint venture with Wintershall, the subsidiary of BASF, for gas transportation
 Wintershall Erdgas Handelshaus GmbH & Co. KG (50%) - joint venture with Wintershall for gas trading
 НТВ Europa GmbH

Gibraltar
 Bleakend Holdings Limited

Greece
 Prometheus Gas (50%) - joint company with Copelouzos Group

Hungary
 Panrusgáz (40%) - trading and transport of natural gas
 Borsodchem (25%) - petrochemicals
 TVK (13.5%)
 DKG-EAST Co (38.1%) - oil and gas equipment manufacturing
 Gazkomplekt KFT
 NTV Hungary Commercial Limited Liability Company

Iraq
Gazprom Neft Badra B.V.
Gazprom Neft Garmian B.V.

Ireland
GPB Finance Plc. - investment company

Israel
 N.T.V. Global Network (Israel) Ltd.

Italy
 Promgas (100%) - joint venture with ENI
 Volta SpA (49%) - joint venture with Edison S.p.A.

Kazakhstan
 KazRosGaz (50%) - joint venture with KazMunayGas

Kyrgyzstan
 Gazprom Kyrgyzstan (100%)

Latvia
 Latvijas Gāze (34%)

Liechtenstein
 IDF Anlagegesellschaft - investment company (holding via Siritia Ventures Ltd., Cyprus)

Lithuania
 Kaunas CHP (100%)
 Stella Vitae (30%)

Moldova
 Moldovagaz (50%) plus 13.44% through debt shares of Tiraspoltransgaz

Netherlands
 Brochan B.V.
 BSPS B.V. (50%) - operator of the Blue Stream pipeline
 Gazinvest Finance B.V.
 Gazprom Finance B.V.
 Gazprom EP International B.V. (100%)
 Gazprom Sakhalin Holdings B.V. - owns 50%+1 share in Sakhalin Energy, the operator of the Sakhalin-II oil and gas field
 NTV Plus B.V.
 NTV-НТВ Holding and Finance B.V
 PeterGaz B.V.
 Sib Finance B.V.
 West East Pipeline Project Investment (100%) - construction and investment company

Nigeria
 Nigaz (50%) - joint venture with the Nigerian National Petroleum Corporation

Poland
 EuRoPol Gaz (48%) - operator of the Polish section of Yamal-Europe pipeline registered name: SYSTEM GAZOCIĄGÓW TRANZYTOWYCH "EUROPOL GAZ" SPÓŁKA AKCYJNA
 Gas Trading (18.4%) - gas trading (exact name not found in registers) registered name: WARSAW GAS TRADING SPÓŁKA Z OGRANICZONĄ ODPOWIEDZIALNOŚCIĄ

Romania
WIEE Romania SRL (50%) - gas distribution
 WIROM Gas S.A. (2&%) - gas trading, controlled through WIEH

Serbia
 YugoRosGaz (50%) - gas trading and transport
 Progress Gas (50%) - gas trading
 Naftna industrija Srbije (51%)

Slovakia
 Slovenský plynárenský priemysel - 49% shares are owned by Slovak Gas Holding B.V., a consortium of Gaz de France and E.ON Ruhrgas Gazprom was part of consortium winning the privatisation of Slovenský plynárenský priemysel, but hasn't never entered the company.
 Slovrusgaz (50%) - gas trading and transport

Slovenia
 Tagdem (7.6%) - gas trading

Switzerland
 Baltic LNG AG (80%) - joint venture with Sovkomflot for the development and sale of LNG
 Gas Project Development Central Asia AG (50%) - joint venture with Centrex Gas & Energy Europe AG
 Nord Stream AG (51%) - joint project company with E.ON, BASF and Gasunie for the contraction and operation of the Nord Stream 1 pipeline
 RosUkrEnergo AG (50%) - gas trading in Ukraine
 Shtokman Development AG (51%) - joint project company with Total S.A. (25%) and Statoil (24%) to develop Shtokman gas field first phase
 Sibur-Europe (100%) - investment company
 South Stream AG (50%) -  joint project company with Eni for the contraction and operation of the South Stream pipeline
 Wintershall Erdgas Handelshaus Zug AG (WIEE) (50%) - gas trading
 ZMB (Schweiz) AG (100%) - gas trading

Turkey
 Bosphorus Gaz Corporation AS - Securing Energy for Europe owns 71%
 Turusgaz (45%) - a joint venture with BOTAS

Ukraine
 YuzhNIIgiprogaz

United Kingdom
 Gazprom UK Ltd (100%)- investment company
 Gazprom Marketing and Trading Limited (GM&T) (100%) - energy trading
 HydroWingas (25%) - gas trading
 Interconnector (UK) Limited  (10%) - operator of the Interconnector pipeline
 Sibur International (100%) - petrochemicals
 WINGAS Storage UK Ltd. (33%) - underground gas storage reconstruction

British Virgin Islands
 Benton Solutions Inc.
 Media Financial Limited
 Nagelfar Trade & Invest Ltd.
 NTV Media International Limited
 Sib Oil Trade (100%) - oil trading

References

External links
 Gazprom's website
 Gazprom’s European Web. The Jamestown Foundation. February 2009

 
Gazprom
Gazprom